Auburn Hills is a city in Oakland County in the U.S. state of Michigan. The population was 21,412 at the 2010 census. Before incorporating as a city in 1983, the area was part of the now-defunct Pontiac Township. It is home to Oakland University and the U.S. headquarters of Stellantis, BorgWarner and Volkswagen.

History 
The estate included hunting land, dog kennels, a swimming pool, horse stables, and a  Colonial Revival house. Pontiac Township purchased the estate in 1976, and adapted the buildings for government use. Today, it is known as the Auburn Hills Civic Center.

The first use of the name "Auburn Hills," in 1964, was by Oakland Community College. They named their campus (a former Nike missile base) at Featherstone and Squirrel roads for the town and the hilly terrain in the area. Besides Oakland Community College, three other colleges, Oakland University, Baker College, and Western Michigan University Thomas M. Cooley Law School have campuses partially within the city limits.

Incorporation history 
Auburn Hills began as Pontiac Township, including the village of Auburn, in 1821, at what is today the corner of Auburn and Squirrel roads. Situated on the Clinton River, it was named by Aaron Webster, the first settler, for Auburn, New York. His sawmill and grist mill attracted settlers to Auburn. After the streets were laid out in 1826, Auburn rivaled nearby Pontiac until the 1860s, when it lost its own prosperity. The town was renamed Amy in 1880, and it officially became Auburn Heights in 1919. Pontiac Township bordered the city of Pontiac on two sides. The township attempted to incorporate as Pontiac Heights in 1971, but was denied by state officials. Pontiac Township became a charter township in 1978, to protect itself from further annexation. In 1983, Pontiac Township merged with the village of Auburn Heights to become the City of Auburn Hills. It is not to be confused with the similarly named city of Auburn, Michigan, that exists in Bay County, near Saginaw Bay.

Geography

Demographics

2010 census
As of the census of 2010, there were 21,412 people, 8,844 households, and 4,923 families living in the city. The racial makeup of the city was 66.3% White, 18.5% African American, 0.3% Native American, 8.9% Asian, 2.7% from other races, and 3.4% from two or more races. Hispanic or Latino of any race were 7.8% of the population.

There were 8,844 households, of which 27.0% had children under the age of 18 living with them, 38.8% were married couples living together, 12.4% had a female householder with no husband present, 4.5% had a male householder with no wife present, and 44.3% were non-families. 33.5% of all households were made up of individuals, and 7.3% had someone living alone who was 65 years of age or older. The average household size was 2.24 and the average family size was 2.90.

The median age in the city was 31.4 years. 19.4% of residents were under the age of 18; 17.8% were between the ages of 18 and 24; 31.9% were from 25 to 44; 21.6% were from 45 to 64; and 9.4% were 65 years of age or older. The gender makeup of the city was 48.4% female and 51.6% male.

2000 census
As of the census of 2000, there were 19,837 people, 8,064 households, and 4,604 families living in the city. The racial makeup of the city was 75.92% White, 13.22% African American, 0.32% Native American, 6.33% Asian, 0.04% Pacific Islander, 1.56% from other races, and 2.61% from two or more races. Hispanic or Latino of any race were 4.50% of the population.

There were 8,064 households, out of which 26.7% had children under the age of 18 living with them; 43.0% were married couples living together; 10.5% had a female householder with no husband present and 42.9% were non-families. 33.1% of all households were made up of individuals, and 6.0% had someone living alone who was 65 years of age or older. The average household size was 2.25 and the average family size was 2.92.

The age distribution is 20.4% under the age of 18, 15.9% from 18 to 24, 38.1% from 25 to 44, 18.2% from 45 to 64, and 7.3% who were 65 years of age or older. The median age was 31 years. For every 100 females, there were 98.3 males. For every 100 females age 18 and over, there were 97.5 males.

The median income for a household in the city was $51,376, and the median income for a family was $60,849. Males had a median income of $45,686 versus $34,015 for females. The per capita income for the city was $25,529. About 3.9% of families and 6.3% of the population were below the poverty line, including 6.4% of those under age 18 and 4.4% of those age 66 or over.

Economy

Auburn Hills roughly follows the course of Interstate 75 and is home to a prosperous business community. In the early 1980s, Oakland University partnered with developers to create a technology and research park. The Oakland Technology Park was approved by the city in 1985, with Comerica, EDS, and Chrysler to build campuses there. The city's many tech and office buildings host 80,000 people during the workday.

Great Lakes Crossing Outlets, an enclosed super-regional outlet shopping mall, opened November 12, 1998.

In 2002, the area at Auburn and Squirrel was revitalized as the "Village Center" with streetscape improvements. Pedestrian-friendly development is encouraged in this district now known simply as Downtown Auburn Hills. At the end of 2013, a number of large projects were completed Downtown, including a four-story graduate student apartment complex, a 233-space parking deck, an auxiliary classroom space for schools and colleges called the University Center and the Downtown Educational Nook (DEN), a refurbished historic log cabin acting as a student and community center.

Auburn Hills is home to BorgWarner, Guardian Industries, Autoliv, RGIS, Joyson Safety Systems, the Americas headquarters of GKN Driveline, the North American headquarters of Faurecia, Volkswagen/Audi North American Headquarters, and until its demolition, The Palace of Auburn Hills, the former home of the National Basketball Association's Detroit Pistons and the former home of Women's National Basketball Association's Detroit Shock.

In 2017, Maserati announced it was moving its U.S. headquarters from Englewood Cliffs, New Jersey to the former Walter P. Chrysler Museum in  Auburn Hills.

Education

Primary and secondary schools
School districts serving sections of Auburn Hills include Avondale School District, Pontiac School District, and Rochester Community Schools.

The Avondale School District operates two elementary schools in the city limits: R. Grant Graham Elementary School and Auburn Elementary School. Portions of Auburn Hills in ASD are zoned to these schools. All ASD residents are zoned to Avondale Middle School in Rochester Hills and Avondale High School in Auburn Hills. Other ASD facilities in Auburn Hills include the district administrative offices and Avondale Montessori. A Pontiac school district school, Will Rogers Elementary School, is located in northeastern Auburn Hills.

Private schools in Auburn Hills include:
Auburn Hills Christian School
Oakland Christian School

Private schools near Auburn Hills:
Notre Dame Preparatory/Marist Academy, Pontiac
 Holy Family Regional School (HFRS) - Consists of a grade PK-3 North Campus in Rochester and a 4-8 South Campus in Rochester Hills. Two churches in Auburn Hills designate HFRS as the parish school: St. John Fisher Chapel and Sacred Heart of the Hills. The first two sponsored the school from the beginning and the other three joined later, with Sacred Heart being the final one.

Higher education
The main campus of Oakland University sits within Auburn Hills. Oakland Community College, Baker College, and Western Michigan University Thomas M. Cooley Law School are also situated in Auburn Hills.

Parks and recreation
Auburn Hills is home to several local parks, many of which are open year-round.

Auburn Hills Skate Park
A skateboard, inline skate and BMX bike park open to all ages and skill levels. The use of the facility is always free and it remains open from April to November, 8 a.m. until dusk.

Civic Center Park
Popular hiking and walking attraction with numerous nature trails. A fishing pond and picnic area are also available for public use. The park offers open lawn areas and a picnic shelter with a fireplace inside. The park features a softball field, 9-hole disc golf course, tennis courts, two play structures, and swings. 

Clinton River Trail
An expansive,  walkway through the heart of Oakland County. The trail cuts through several different cities, including Rochester, Rochester Hills, Sylvan Lake, Auburn Hills, and Pontiac. The  section of trail within Auburn Hills is covered in finely crushed stone, ideal for walking, jogging and biking.

Dennis Dearing Jr. Memorial Park
Featuring a fireman-themed "tot-lot" for children ages 2–5, Dennis Dearing Jr. Memorial Park is a popular spot for families with children. The park also has swings, picnic tables and open space areas for picnic or play.

Hawk Woods Nature Center
Hawk Woods offers endless opportunities for outdoor recreational activities.  This unique preserve offers a brand new lodge, groomed nature trails, a heated restroom/shower facility open year-round, a covered picnic shelter that can be reserved in season, six overnight camping cabins, all complemented by 88 acres of beautiful woods, meadows, and marsh. Learn more about renting out the Hawk Woods Lodge HERE.

Manitoba Park
A two-acre park which contains a play structure, sand volleyball courts, a paved play area and open space for activities.

Riverside Park
Located adjacent to downtown Auburn Hills and along the Clinton River, Riverside Park is a popular spot during the warmer months. A canoe launch is open during the warm season.

River Woods Park
Located near downtown Auburn Hills, this park has picnic areas, both open and sheltered, standing barbecue grills and heated restrooms which remain open year-round. Visitors can navigate through the park on a paved pathway system, which includes a bridge over the Clinton River. The park also contains four basketball courts and play structures.

See also

Walter P. Chrysler Museum

References

External links

City of Auburn Hills
Auburn Hills Public Library

 
Cities in Oakland County, Michigan
Metro Detroit
Populated places established in 1983
1983 establishments in Michigan